Dougall is a surname. Notable people with the surname include:

Allan H. Dougall (1836–1912), Scottish soldier
Andy Dougall (1884–1941), Australian rules footballer
Anton B. Dougall (born 1952), Maltese chef, writer and television personality
Ben Dougall (born 1991), Australian cricketer
Billy Dougall (1895–1966), Scottish football player and manager
Eric Stuart Dougall (1886–1918), English recipient
Hugh W. Dougall (1872–1963), American Latter Day Saint hymn writer and Mormon missionary
James Dougall (1810–1888), Scottish politician
John Dougall (actor), British actor
John Dougall (mathematician) (1867–1960), Scottish mathematician
John Dougall (merchant) (1808–1886), Scottish-born Canadian merchant
John Dougall (Utah politician) (born 1966), American politician
John Joseph Dougall (1860–1934), mayor of Christchurch, New Zealand
Kenneth Dougall (born 1993), Australian soccer player
Lily Dougall (1858–1923), Canadian author and feminist
Maria Young Dougall (1849–1935), Utah suffragist
Neil Dougall (1921–2009), Scottish footballer
Nicolas Dougall (born 1992), South African cyclist
Rad Dougall (born 1951), South African former racing driver
Peter Dougall (1909–1974), Scottish footballer
Robert Dougall (footballer) (1910–1988), Scottish footballer
Robert Dougall (1913–1999), English broadcaster and ornithologist
Rona Dougall (born 1966), Scottish broadcast journalist and television presenter
Rose Elinor Dougall (born 1986), English singer, songwriter and musician	
Sean Dougall (born 1989), Irish rugby player
Tommy Dougall (1921–1997), Scottish football winger and manager

See also 
Dougal (disambiguation)
McDougall (disambiguation)
Dougall Avenue, is a busy four-lane urban arterial road, linking Downtown Windsor
Dougall Canal, is a canal in Simcoe County, Ontario, Canada
Dougall Media, is a Canadian media company